Apothecary to the Household at Windsor is an officer of the Medical Household of the Royal Household of the Sovereign of the United Kingdom. They have a salaried daily surgery. The current Apothecary to the Household at Windsor is Kirstin Ostle, the first female post holder.

List of apothecaries 
 William Fairbank MD 1901 (jointly)
 William A. Ellison MD 1901 (jointly)
 Sir Henry Linnington Martyn (1888–1947) KCVO MB BS FRCS LRCP 1919–1938
 E. Claud Malden CVO MB BCh MRCS LRCP 1938–1952
 Richard W. L. May CVO MB BCh MRCS LRCP 1952–1965
 J. P. Clayton CVO MA MB BChir MRCS LRCP 1965–1986
 John H. D. Briscoe LVO MA MB BChir MRCGP DObst RCOG 1986–1997
 Jonathan Holliday CVO 1997– 2019
 Kirstin Ostle MBchB DCH DRCOG MRCGP DMJ DFFP  2019 -

References 

Positions within the British Royal Household